Guryevsky (masculine), Guryevskaya (feminine), or Guryevskoye (neuter) may refer to:
Guryevsky District, several districts in Russia
Guryevsky Urban Okrug, a municipal formation which Gureyevsky District of Kaliningrad Oblast, Russia is incorporated as
Guryevskoye Urban Settlement, several municipal urban settlements in Russia
Guryevsky (rural locality) (Guryevskaya, Guryevskoye), several rural localities in Russia